Knud Haraldsen Krabbe (3 March 1885 – 8 May 1961) was a Danish neurologist. In 1916, he first described what is now known as Krabbe disease. He was considered a major figure in Nordic Neurology.

References 

1885 births
1961 deaths
Danish neurologists
University of Copenhagen alumni
19th-century Danish people
20th-century Danish physicians